The work of the Scottish Government is carried out by Directorates, each headed by a Director. The Directorates are grouped into a number of Directorates-General families, each headed by a Director-General. However, the individual Directorates are the building blocks of the system. The Directorates are further broken down into "Divisions" and then by teams. Divisions usually consist of 25-50 people. There is no direct correspondence between the political responsibilities of the Ministers in the Scottish Government and the Directorates, although in some cases there is considerable overlap. The Directorates are also responsible for a number of government agencies and non-departmental public bodies. Some government work is also carried out by Executive Agencies such as Transport Scotland, who sit outside the Directorates structure, but are also staffed by civil servants

The current system of Directorates was created by a December 2010 re-organisation. Prior to 2007 the Directorates were preceded by similar structures called "Departments" that no longer exist (although the word is still sometimes used in this context).

The Permanent Secretary to the Scottish Government is the most senior civil servant in Scotland. The role is currently occupied by John-Paul Marks, who replaced Leslie Evans in January 2022. The current structure of the directorates is given below.

Communities 
Director-General, Paul Johnston

Directorates
 Equality, Inclusion and Human Rights
 Housing and Social Justice
 Local Government and Communities
 Social Security

Constitution and External Affairs 
Director-General, Ken Thomson

Directorates
 Constitution and Cabinet
 COVID Co-ordination
 External Affairs
 Organisational Readiness
 EU Directorate
 Parliamentary Counsel Office

Corporate 
Director-General, Lesley Fraser

Directorates
 Communications, Ministerial Support and Workplace
 Digital
 Financial Management
 Legal Services (Solicitor to the Scottish Government)
 People
 Scottish Procurement and Property

Economy Directorates
Director-General, Elinor Mitchell

Directorates
 Chief Economist
 Culture and Major Events
 Economic Development
 Energy and Climate Change
 Fair Work, Employability and Skills
 International Trade and Investment

Net Zero Directorates
Director-General, Roy Brannen

Directorates
 Agriculture and Rural Economy
 Energy and Climate Change
 Environment and Forestry
 Marine Scotland

Education and Justice 
Director-General, Joe Griffin

Directorates
 Advanced Learning and Science
 Children and Families
 Early Learning and Childcare 
 Justice
 Learning
 Local Government and Communities
 Safer Communities
 Scottish Fire Services College

Exchequer 
Director-General, Alyson Stafford

Directorates
 Budget and Public Spending
 Internal Audit and Assurance
 Performance and Strategic Outcomes
 Taxation and Fiscal Sustainability

Health and Social Care
Director-General and Chief Executive of NHS Scotland, Caroline Lamb

Directorates
 Chief Medical Officer
 Chief Nursing Officer
 COVID Public Health
 Digital Reform and Service Engagement
 Health Finance, Corporate Governance and Value
 Health Performance and Delivery
 Health Workforce
 Mental Health and Social Care 
 Population Health 
 Primary Care
 Quality and Improvement
 Test and Protect
 Vaccine Strategy and Policy 

Note: In the September 2011 civil service reorganisation, three Directorates were combined.  These were: the Cabinet, Strategy and Performance, and International and Constitution.

References

External links 
How government is run - Scottish Government
List of directorates - Scottish Government

 
Scotland politics-related lists
2007 establishments in Scotland
Government agencies established in 2007